Link (リンク) is the twenty-second single by the Japanese Pop-rock band Porno Graffitti. It was released on July 18, 2007.

Usage in other media 
 The song is featured on Qatar Airways, the state-owned flag carrier of Qatar and the world's largest 5-star airline according to Skytrax. Qatar Airways becomes the only airline operator and a member of Oneworld alliance.
 The song was featured in the third generation Subaru Impreza for the Japanese market.

Track listing

References

2007 singles
Porno Graffitti songs
2007 songs
SME Records singles